Alexandra Szarvas (born 7 September 1992 in Budapest) is a Hungarian football striker, currently playing for Basel in the Swiss Nationalliga A.

Raised in Ferencváros, Szarvas moved in 2008 to Viktória FC-Szombathely, with which she won the Hungarian Championship and played the UEFA Champions League. In 2011 Bayern Munich, which had knocked out Viktoria in the Champions League, signed Szarvas for its farm team in the 2nd Bundesliga, where she scored 7 goals in 16 appearances. For the 2012–13 season she was transferred to newly promoted VfL Sindelfingen. Later on, Szarvas went to play in Switzerland for SC Kriens and Basel.

She played her first match for the Hungarian national team on November 2010 in a friendly against the Czech Republic.

Titles
 1 Hungarian league: 2009
 2 Hungarian national cup: 2009, 2011

References

External links
 

1992 births
Living people
Hungarian women's footballers
Ferencvárosi TC (women) footballers
Viktória FC-Szombathely players
Expatriate women's footballers in Germany
Hungarian expatriate sportspeople in Germany
Hungarian expatriate sportspeople in Switzerland
Footballers from Budapest
Women's association football forwards
Hungary women's international footballers
Expatriate women's footballers in Switzerland
Hungarian expatriate footballers